The 2015 Minor Counties Championship was the 111th Minor Counties Cricket Championship season, and the second under the name 'Unicorn Counties Championship'. It was contested in two divisions: Eastern and Western. Cumberland won the competition for the third time after defeating Oxfordshire by 10 wickets in the final played in Carlisle.

Standings
 Pld = Played, W = Wins, W1 = Win in match reduced to single innings, L = Losses, L1 = Loss in match reduced to single innings, T = Ties, D = Draws, D1 = Draw in match reduced to single innings, A = Abandonments, Bat = Batting points, Bowl = Bowling points, Ded = Deducted points, Pts = Points, Net RPW = Net runs per wicket (runs per wicket for less runs per wicket against).

Teams receive 16 points for a win, 8 for a tie and 4 for a draw. Teams also received 12 points for a win, 6 for a draw and 4 points for losing a match reduced to a single innings. Bonus points (a maximum of 4 batting points and 4 bowling points) may be scored during the first 90 overs of each team's first innings.

Eastern Division

Western Division

Final

Averages

References

2015 in English cricket
2015
Domestic cricket competitions in 2015–16